The weightlifting competition at the 1996 Summer Olympics in Atlanta consisted of ten weight classes.

Medal summary

Medal table

Participating nations
A total of 236 weightlifters from 77 nations competed at the Atlanta Games:

References

Sources
 
 

 
Olympic
1996 Summer Olympics events
1996